Hyalobagrus is a genus of bagrid catfishes found in Southeast Asia.

Species 
There are currently three recognized species in this genus:
 Hyalobagrus flavus H. H. Ng & Kottelat, 1998 (Shadow catfish)
 Hyalobagrus leiacanthus H. H. Ng & Kottelat, 1998
 Hyalobagrus ornatus (Duncker, 1904)

Distribution
Hyalobagrus species are distributed in Asia.

Description
These catfish species are small and transparent. The three species can be distinguished by differences in body shape, coloration, and the degree of serrations on the anterior edge of the pectoral fin spine. The three species range from about 3–4.4 centimetres (1.2–1.7 in) SL.

Hyalobagrus species are sexually dimorphic, males possess a genital papilla, and gravid females are easy to spot since their blue-green eggs are visible through their bellies.

Ecology
These catfish are mid-water swimmers. They are also schooling fish. In their natural habitat, they are almost always found closely associated with submerged vegetation.

In the aquarium
H. flavus and H. ornatus are known to be exported for the aquarium trade. H. flavus first appeared in the hobby in the 1980s. They seem to do best in a heavily planted tank with tankmates that will not out compete them for food. They are a peaceful, diurnal community species that accept all kinds of foods. None of these species have been bred in captivity.

References

Bagridae
Fish of Asia
Taxa named by Heok Hee Ng
Taxa named by Maurice Kottelat
Catfish genera
Freshwater fish genera